Supermodel po-ukrainsky, season 2  was the second season of Supermodel po-ukrainsky. The season featured fifteen contestants, along with an additional sixteenth who entered as a replacement, who competed together for approximately fourteen weeks. The series itself immediately derives its format from Spanish modeling series Supermodelo. The season premiered on August 28, 2015.

The winner of the competition was 16-year-old Alina Panyuta from Donetsk. As part of her prizes, she received the opportunity to star on the cover of Pink Magazine in Ukraine, as well as contracts with K Models and Next Model Management in Milan.

Anya Sulima and Arina Lyubityelyeva would later return to compete for the tile in Top Model po-ukrainsky, cycle 7. Anya Sulima was elminited im Episode 1. Arina Lyubityelyeva was eliminated in Episode 9.

Series summary

Casting
In contrast to the previous season, online submissions were allowed. Live castings were held in the cities of Lviv, Dnipropetrovsk, Odessa and Kyiv from February to March 2015. 200 selected applicants from the auditions were narrowed down to 30 semi-finalists who received a callback. Of these 30, 15 were selected to be a part of the final cast.

Destinations
The destination for the season was in Chernivtsi, Lviv, Zhytomyr and Odessa in Ukraine. This season does not have an international destination.

Contestants
(ages stated are at start of contest)

Episodes

Episode 1
Original airdate: 

This was the casting episode. Out of 30 semi-finalists the top 15 contestants were chosen.

Episode 2
Original airdate: 

Quit: Sveta Melashych	
Replacement: Alina Panyuta	
Eliminated: Katerina Yusupova

Episode 3
Original Airdate: 

Challenge winner: Lera Miroshnichenko
Immune from elimination: Lera Miroshnichenko
Eliminated: Katerina Lisenko

Episode 4
Original Airdate: 

Challenge winner: Vika Maremuha
Immune from elimination: Vika Maremuha
Eliminated: Mariya Parsenyuk

Episode 5
Original Airdate: 

Challenge winners: Nastya Tronko, Katya Kohanova, Karina Zabolotna, Marina Kiryakova, Nina Krohmalyuk & Vika Maremuha
Immune from elimination: Nastya Tronko, Katya Kohanova, Karina Zabolotna, Marina Kiryakova, Nina Krohmalyuk & Vika Maremuha
Originally eliminated: Arina Lyubityelyeva

Episode 6
Original Airdate: 

Challenge winner: Marina Kiryakova
 Eliminated: Marina Kiryakova

Episode 7
Original Airdate: 

Challenge winner: Anya Sulima
 Eliminated: Katya Kohanova

Episode 8
Original Airdate: 

Challenge winner: Nina Krohmalyuk
Immune from elimination: Nina Krohmalyuk
Eliminated: Nastya Tronko & Nantina Dronchak

Episode 9
Original Airdate: 

Challenge winner: Karina Zabolotna
Immune from elimination: Karina Zabolotna
Bottom two (chosen by the contestants): Anya Sulima & Nina Krohmalyuk
Eliminated: Nina Krohmalyuk

Episode 10
Original Airdate: 

Eliminated: Nastya Pushnya
Special guest: Vlada Rogovenko

Episode 11
Original Airdate: 

Challenge winner: Alina Panyuta
Eliminated: Karina Zabolotna

Episode 12
Original Airdate: 

Challenge winner: Vika Maremuha
Eliminated: Anya Sulima

Episode 13
Original Airdate: 

Challenge winners: Alina Panyuta, Arina Lyubityelyeva, Lera Miroshnichenko & Vika Maremuha			
Eliminated: None

Episode 14
Original Airdate: 

Challenge winner: Vika Maremuha			
Eliminated:  Lera Miroshnichenko

Episode 15
Original Airdate: 
Final three: Alina Panyuta, Arina Lyubityelyeva & Vika Maremuha
Eliminated: Arina Lyubityelyeva	
Final two: Alina Panyuta & Vika Maremuha	
Ukraine's Next Top Model: Alina Panyuta
Special prize,  year's supply of cosmetics Inglot: Anya Sulima

Summaries

Results

 The contestant quit the competition
 The contestant was eliminated
 The contestant was immune from elimination
 The contestant was originally eliminated, but was saved
 The contestant won the competition

Photo shoot guide

Episode 1 photo shoot: Posing with letters from the show's logo (casting)
Episode 2 photo shoots: Splattered with paint; posing with instruments
Episode 3 photo shoot: Posing at the end of the runway
Episode 4 photo shoot: Dynamic posing in edgy clothing
Episode 5 photo shoot: Native dance styles from around the world
Episode 6 photo shoot: Levitation
Episode 7 photo shoot: Broken doll campaign against domestic violence
Episode 8 photo shoot: Campaign for being attentive on the road with noisy passengers
Episode 9 photo shoot: Underwater cosmic shoot
Episode 10 photo shoot: Bats hanging upside down
Episode 11 photo shoot: Animorphs in body paint
Episode 12 photo shoot: Gladiators with male models
Episode 13 photo shoot: Pirates on a ship
Episode 14 photo shoot: Patients in an insane asylum
Episode 15 photo shoots: Charlie Chaplin; Battle of the princesses in the air; Luxury on a yacht for Pink magazine

Judges
 Alla Kostromichova (Host & Head judge) - Top model
 Sergey Nikityuk (Judge) - Model scout
 Sonya Plakidyuk (Judge) - Fashion photographer
 Richard Gorn (Judge) - Fashion director

References

External links
Official website
Full recap of 2 season from fans

Ukraine
2015 Ukrainian television seasons